Draco obscurus, the dusky gliding lizard, is a species of agamid lizard. It is found in Indonesia and Thailand.

References

Draco (genus)
Reptiles of Indonesia
Reptiles of Thailand
Reptiles described in 1887
Taxa named by George Albert Boulenger